Senator Joiner may refer to:

Lemuel W. Joiner (1810–1886), Wisconsin State Senate
Robert Joiner (1841–1920), Wisconsin State Senate